Kallur is a village in the Dharwad district of Karnataka, India.

Demographics 
As of the 2011 Census of India there were 590 households in Kallur and a total population of 2,836 consisting of 1,424 males and 1,412 females. There were 404 children ages 0-6.

References

Villages in Dharwad district